The International Collective of Female Cinematographers (The ICFC) is a collective of professional cinematographers from around the world that works to advance the careers of female cinematographers by connecting with filmmakers and production teams to find a qualified crew. In the top-grossing 100 films only 2% of them were shot by women cinematographers. The collective was founded in 2016 by a group of female cinematographers who wanted to act as allies within the film industry and provide each other with community support and advocacy.  Notable members include Nancy Schreiber, Rachel Morrison, Amy Vincent, and Ellen Kuras.

ICFC members identify as simply "Cinematographers"—without gender qualifiers. However, as a group, they have found it helpful to organize around gender until such time as women cease to be perceived as statistical anomalies or token hires behind the lens.

The collective holds regular events for members to explore various cinematography related topics and new technology. Globally, they link film productions to a variety of Cinematographers with specialties ranging from narrative film, documentary, commercials, music videos, and virtual reality.

References 

International women's organizations
Arts organizations established in 2016
Film organizations in the United States
Women's film organizations

External links